Poison Tree may refer to:

Literature
"A Poison Tree", a 1794 poem by William Blake
Poison Tree (novel), a 2012 novel by Amelia Atwater-Rhodes
The Poison Tree (play), a play by Robert Glaudini
The Poison Tree, 1994 novel by Cynthia Harrod-Eagles
The Poison Tree, 2009 book by Erin Kelly
Vishabriksha (The Poison Tree), 1873 novel by Bankim Chandra Chattopadhyay

Music
 The Poison Tree, a band led by Nick Castro
"A Poison Tree", classical song by Benjamin Britten on the Blake poem 
"A Poison Tree", song by Gary Lucas from Gods and Monsters
"A Poison Tree", song by Finn Coren from Spring: The Appendix
"A Poison Tree", song by North Sea Radio Orchestra from Birds 
"Poison Tree", song by Beth Orton from Sugaring Season
"Poison Tree", a musical rendering of the Blake poem by Goanna
"Poison Tree", song by Finnish a cappella ensemble Rajaton from Boundless
"The Poison Tree", 2006 song by David Axelrod from Songs of Experience
"The Poison Tree", song by Greg Brown Songs of Innocence and of Experience
"The Poison Tree", song by Moby from Destroyed

See also
Fruit of the poisonous tree, a legal metaphor used to describe evidence that is obtained illegally